= The Familiar Face =

1953 film

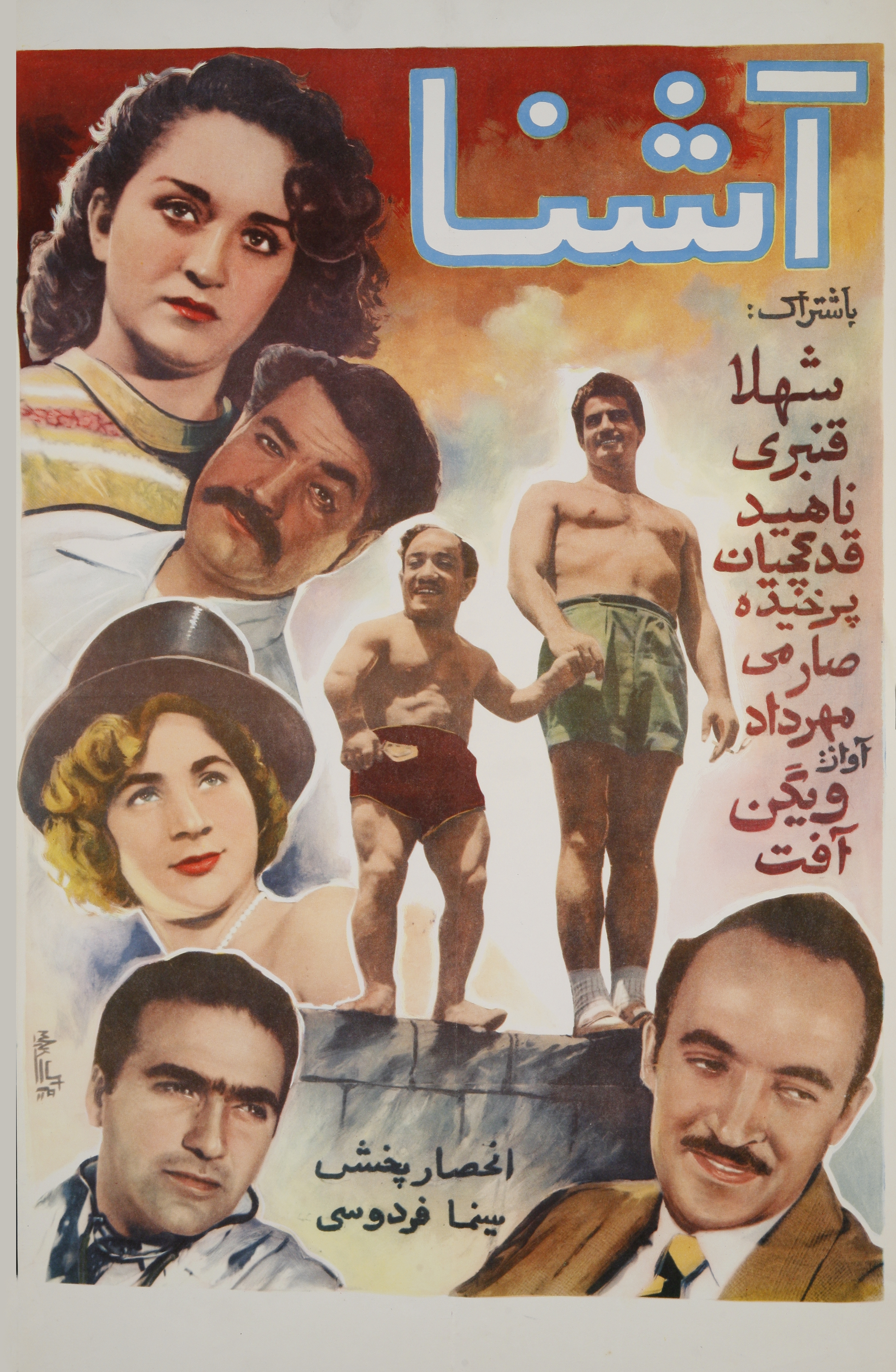
- Directed by: Hassan Kheradmand
- Written by: Hassan Kheradmand
- Cinematography: Enayatallah Famin
- Production company: Jahan Film
- Release date: 29 April 1953
- Running time: 95 minutes
- Country: Iran
- Language: Persian

The Familiar Face (Persian: Chehrehe ashna) is a 1953 Iranian film directed by Hassan Kheradmand and starring Hamid Ghanbari.
